Novi Sad Fair is an event management company located in Novi Sad, Serbia, which organizes one of the largest agricultural fairs in Southeast Europe. Taking place every May in Novi Sad, it is also one of the largest agricultural fairs in Europe, with approximately 600,000 visitors attending the event. Novi Sad Fair also organizes other shows, e.g. technology and finance, as well as congresses and exhibitions, which brings in a total of about one million visitors to the city each year.

Features

Novi Sad Fair owns a vast exhibition space, the size of the total area being 300,000 m² (240,000 m² outside and 60,000 m² inside). The company also has a newly built congress building, called the "Master Centre", which measures 2,700 m².

Novi Sad Fair is a member of The Global Association of the Exhibition Industry, International Congress & Convention Association, The Exhibition Association of Southeast Europe, World-Wide Business Centres Network, and Central European Fair Alliance.

History
The city of Novi Sad was historically a popular place for traders. In the 19th century, it quickly became an important trading post, due to its location on the Danube river and on the natural border between the Bačka and Syrmia regions. Novi Sad is also situated in Vojvodina, Serbia, which at the time was the most developed agricultural region in the then Kingdom of Yugoslavia. It therefore became home to the country's first agricultural show in 1923, becoming international later on in 1930.

In 1958, Novi Sad Fair became a member of an international fair organization and also gained a reputation for being the most important agricultural show in the then SFR Yugoslavia. Besides organizing the annual agricultural show, the company had held many other fairs over the years, dedicated to finance, computing, banking, cars, books, pharmaceuticals, etc.

Exhibitions and Fairs

See also
 Belgrade Fair

References

External links

 

1923 establishments in Yugoslavia
Event venues established in 1923
Fair
Annual fairs
Agricultural shows
Agriculture in Serbia
Fair
Economy of Vojvodina
Fair
Fairs in Serbia